The Chess World Cup 2019 was a 128-player single-elimination chess tournament that took place in Khanty-Mansiysk, Russia, from 9 September to 4 October 2019. It was won by Azerbaijani grandmaster Teimour Radjabov. He and the runner-up, Ding Liren, both qualified for the Candidates Tournament for the World Chess Championship 2020. It was the 8th edition of the Chess World Cup.

Levon Aronian, the winner of the Chess World Cup 2017, advanced to the quarterfinals before being eliminated by Maxime Vachier-Lagrave on tiebreaks. Vachier-Lagrave was eliminated by Radjabov in the semi-finals, but  defeated Yu Yangyi to claim 3rd place.

Bidding process
There was only one bid received for the combined FIDE World Cup and Olympiad events, which was done by the Yugra Chess Federation.

Format
The tournament was a 7-round knockout event. The matches from round 1 to round 6 consisted of two classical games with a time control of 90 minutes per 40 moves plus 30 minutes for the rest of the game, with an increment of 30 seconds per move. The finals and the match for the third place consisted of four classical games.

If the score is tied after the classical games, rapid and, if necessary, blitz tiebreaks are played the next day. Two games are played with a time control of 25 minutes per game plus 10 seconds increment. In the case of a tie, they are followed by two games with a time control of 10 minutes per game plus 10 seconds increment. If the score is still tied, two blitz games follow (5 minutes plus 3 seconds increment). If the score is tied 4–4 after all these games, a single "Armageddon" game is played: the player who wins the drawing of lots may choose the colour; White has 5 minutes per game and Black has 4 minutes, with an increment of 2 seconds per move starting from move 61, and White needs a win to advance to the next round; Black advances if they win or the game is drawn.

The two top finishers qualified for the 2020 Candidates Tournament. The rules in fact specified that it would be the top two finishers other than Magnus Carlsen and Fabiano Caruana, because Carlsen as World Champion does not play in the Candidates, and Caruana had already qualified for the Candidates. The rule was introduced because the World Champion and the previous challenger unexpectedly signed up for the previous edition Chess World Cup 2017. This time, though, Carlsen and Caruana both declined their invitations to the World Cup, so the qualifiers are simply the two finalists.

Schedule
Each of the first six rounds took three days: one day each for the two regular time limit games and then a third day for tiebreaks, if required. The final round has four days of regular time limit games and then a fifth day for tiebreaks, if required.
 Round 1: 10 September – 12 September
 Round 2: 13 September – 15 September
 Round 3: 16 September – 18 September
 Rest day: 19 September
 Round 4: 20 September – 22 September
 Round 5: 23 September – 25 September 
 Round 6: 26 September – 28 September
 Rest day: 29 September
 Final and play-off for third place: 30 September – 4 October

Prize money
The total prize fund was US$1,600,000, with the first prize of US$110,000.

Participants
The participants were seeded by their FIDE rating of August 2019. All players are grandmasters unless indicated otherwise.

Qualification paths

Replacements 
 Players from the list of qualifiers who declined to play:
  (World champion)
  (WWC) (decided to instead participate in the FIDE Women's Grand Prix 2019–20)
  (who decided to instead focus on qualifying for the Candidates via the FIDE Grand Swiss Tournament 2019)
  (retired from top level chess in January 2019)
 
  (R)
 Their replacements, all from the ratings list, were:
 
 
 
 
 
  (R)
 Other replacements: 
This made Press the lowest rated player to play in a Chess World Cup.

Results, rounds 1–4

Section 1

Section 2

Section 3

Section 4

Section 5

Section 6

Section 7

Section 8

Results, rounds 5–7

Third place

Finals

References

External links
 
 Pairings tree (PDF). FIDE. 10 August 2019.
 FIDE World Cup 2019 (Games and Results) at The Week in Chess

2019
World Cup
World Cup
2019 in Russian sport
International sports competitions hosted by Russia
Sport in Khanty-Mansiysk
September 2019 sports events in Russia
October 2019 sports events in Russia